Nannophya paulsoni is a species of dragonfly of the family Libellulidae, 
commonly known as the scarlet pygmyfly. 
It is a small dragonfly with red markings found in northern Australia.

Historically, Nannophya paulsoni had been recorded as Nannophya pygmaea in Australia.

Gallery

See also
 List of Odonata species of Australia

References

Libellulidae
Odonata of Australia
Endemic fauna of Australia
Taxa named by Günther Theischinger
Insects described in 2003